This is a list of battles and skirmishes of the American Civil War during the year 1865, the final year of the war. During the year, Union forces were able to capture the last major Confederate ports still open to shipping, along with the Confederate capital, and forced the surrender of the four major Confederate commands.


History

In the Eastern Theater, a combined Union army and naval force, commanded by Major General Alfred H. Terry and Rear Admiral David D. Porter, captured Fort Fisher at the mouth of the Cape Fear River on January 15, which led to the evacuation of other Confederate fortifications along the coastline near Fort Fisher. The capture of Fort Fisher closed the port of Wilmington, North Carolina to Confederate blockade runners, although the Confederates still held the city in order to remove the government supplies stored there and also to prevent Terry from reinforcing William T. Sherman's army, which was then marching north through the Carolinas. After repairing Fort Fisher, Terry was reinforced by the XXIII Corps under Major General John M. Schofield, who took overall command of Union operations in North Carolina. Schofield started his advance towards Wilmington in mid-February with Terry's corps along the east bank, making a demonstration against the main Confederate force there while the XXIII Corps, supported by Porter's gunboats, moved along the west bank of the Cape Fear River. The capture of Fort Anderson on February 19 forced the Confederates to evacuate their defensive positions south of the city; following several more skirmishes, Union forces entered Wilmington on February 22.
 
On April 1 and 2, Union forces commanded by Lieutenant General Ulysses S. Grant launched a series of attacks on the Confederate Army of Northern Virginia near Petersburg, Virginia, overrunning the Confederate fortifications and cutting the supply lines south of the city. As a result, General Robert E. Lee was forced to evacuate both that city and Richmond, ending the nine-month-long Siege of Petersburg. Lee first moved west along the Richmond & Danville Railroad, planning to flee southwards to North Carolina to unite with other Confederate forces. The Confederate army had a head start over the Union army but Lee was forced to wait at Amelia Court House, due to the Confederate units in Richmond being delayed in crossing the Appomattox River; this allowed Union cavalry and infantry to arrive in Jettersville ahead of the Confederates, which forced Lee to march farther west than he had planned before attempting to turn south. Over the next few days, the Union army continued to press the Confederates from the south and the west, forcing Lee to retreat farther westward. At Appomattox Court House, Grant managed to surround Lee and forced him to surrender on April 9.
 

In the Carolinas, Major General William T. Sherman started north from Savannah, Georgia, in late February, planning to unite with U.S. Grant's armies near Petersburg, Virginia. Driving the Confederates from South Carolina through a series of flanking maneuvers, Sherman's forces reached North Carolina in early March, divided into two parts commanded by Henry W. Slocum and Oliver O. Howard. The Confederate commander in the Carolinas was General P. G. T. Beauregard, but both Confederate President Jefferson Davis and Robert E. Lee considered him unable to handle the situation; on February 22 they appointed General Joseph E. Johnston commander of all Confederate forces in North Carolina, which included the Army of Tennessee. He concentrated his available forces together near Smithfield, hoping to attack and defeat one part of Sherman's army before the other part arrived to its assistance. Johnston launched his attack in the Battle of Bentonville on March 19, hitting Slocum's wing but the Confederates were unable to gain a victory before Howard's wing arrived that evening. After waiting at Bentonville for an additional two days, Johnston retreated back to Smithfield. Sherman united with Schofield's force at Goldsboro on March 23; he then spent the next three weeks resting and refitting his command and repairing the railroad to Wilmington. During this time, Johnston remained near Smithfield and also rested and reorganized his force; he also communicated with Lee and agreed to unite the two forces in the hope of defeating either Sherman and Grant before the Union forces could combine. Sherman started advancing against Johnston on April 10, forcing the Confederates to evacuate Smithfield and retreat towards Greensboro; the Union army captured the state capital of Raleigh on April 13. After he received news of Lee's surrender, Johnston surrendered both his army and the remaining Confederate forces in the Department of South Carolina, Georgia, and Florida at the Bennett Place, North Carolina on April 26.
 
In the Western Theater, Major General James H. Wilson led his cavalry corps in a raid through Alabama and Georgia starting on March 22, destroying Confederate manufacturing plants. The Confederate commander in the region, Lieutenant General Nathan Bedford Forrest, had been forced to scatter his cavalry command across northern Mississippi and Alabama during the previous winter and had difficulty concentrating it against Wilson. During the evening of April 1, Forrest concentrated his forces in the defenses of Selma, Alabama; Wilson attacked and defeated him in the Battle of Selma, then continued to the east towards Georgia. Around Mobile, Alabama (the last port still held by the Confederates), Major General Edward Canby started siege operations against the forts protecting the city on March 31, first capturing Spanish Fort on April 8 and Fort Blakely the following day. The Confederates evacuated the city of Mobile without a fight on April 11. The capture of Mobile freed additional Union troops to assist Wilson's cavalry to the north. Both this and word of the Confederate surrenders in Virginia and North Carolina convinced Richard Taylor, commander of the Confederate Department of Alabama, Mississippi, and East Louisiana, to surrender to Canby at Citronelle, Alabama, on May 4. Forrest followed with the surrender of his cavalry command on May 9.

Due to slow communications, the Confederate forces in the Trans-Mississippi Theater did not receive word of the Confederate surrenders in the east for several weeks. The last organized engagement of the war was fought at Palmito Ranch, Texas on May 13 and 14 and resulted in a Confederate victory. Confederate Lieutenant General Edmund Kirby Smith, commander of the Trans-Mississippi Department, surrendered his forces at Shreveport, Louisiana, on June 2, while Confederate forces in the Indian Territory surrendered on June 23. The Confederate raider CSS Shenandoah, which had been in the Pacific Ocean during the months of April and May, only received word of the end of the war on August 2 from a British ship. Fearing execution as pirates if it surrendered to Union forces, the ship instead sailed to Liverpool, United Kingdom, and surrendered to British authorities on November 6.

Engagements

See also

 Conclusion of the American Civil War

Notes

Sources

 Bradley, Mark L. This Astounding Close: The Road to Bennett Place. Chapel Hill, North Carolina: University of North Carolina Press, 2000. .
 Calkins, Chris M. The Appomtattox Campaign: March 29 – April 9, 1865. Conshohocken, Pennsylvania: Combined Books, Inc., 1997. .
 Crow, Vernon. "The Thomas Legion", in Civil War Times Illustrated, Vol. XI, no. 3 (June 1971), pp. 40–45. .
 Fonvielle, Jr., Chris E. Last Rays of Departing Hope: The Wilmington Campaign. Campbell, California: Savas Publishing Company, 1997. .
 Gragg, Rod. Confederate Goliath: The Battle of Fort Fisher. New York: Harper Collins, 1991. .
 Hughes, Jr., Nathaniel Cheairs. Bentonville: The Final Battle of Sherman & Johnston. Chapel Hill, North Carolina: University of North Carolina Press, 1996. .
 Kennedy, Frances H. The Civil War Battlefield Guide, Second Edition. New York: Houghton Mifflin Company, 1998. .
 Smith, David Paul. Frontier Defense in the Civil War: Texas' Rangers and Rebels. College Station, Texas: Texas A&M University Press, 1992. .
 Trudeau, Noah Andre. Out of the Storm: The End of the Storm, April–June 1865. Boston, Massachusetts: Little, Brown and Company, 1994. .

1865 in the United States
American Civil War timelines
Battles of the American Civil War
Battles 1865